Sallustio Pecólo or Sallustio Pecoli (1600 – 7 Jan 1651) was a Roman Catholic prelate who served as Bishop of Venosa (1640–1651).

Biography
Sallustio Pecólo was born in Terni, Italy in 1600 and ordained a priest on 28 October 1640.
On 3 December 1640, he was appointed during the papacy of Pope Urban VIII as Bishop of Venosa.
On 9 December 1640, he was consecrated bishop by Giulio Cesare Sacchetti, Cardinal-Priest of Santa Susanna, with Leonardo Mocenigo, Archbishop of Candia, and Lelio Falconieri, Titular Archbishop of Thebae, serving as co-consecrators. He served as Bishop of Venosa until his resignation on 13 March 1648. 
He died on 7 January 1651.

While bishop, he was the principal co-consecrator of Pietro Paolo Russo, Bishop of Nusco (1649).

References

External links and additional sources
 (for Chronology of Bishops) 
 (for Chronology of Bishops) 

17th-century Italian Roman Catholic bishops
Bishops appointed by Pope Urban VIII
1600 births
1651 deaths